The 2018 Futsal Thai League (also known as AIS Futsal Thai League for sponsorship reasons) was a top-tier professional futsal league under the Football Association of Thailand (FAT) and Advanced Info Service (AIS) It was the tenth edition of the league, with a total of 14 teams. The league began in April 2018 and finished in December 2018.

Teams 
Promoted teams

CAT Telecom Futsal Club and Northeastern University Futsal Club were promoted from the 2017 Thai Championship Futsal League by finishing in the first and second place, respectively.

Relegated teams

Nonthaburi Futsal Club and Nakhon Ratchasima V-One Futsal Club were relegated from the 2018 Thai Championship Futsal League by finishing in the last 2 places of the league.

Renamed teams

Loso-D Thai Tech was renamed to Sripathum GSB Thai-Tech and relocated from Chonburi Province to Bangkok.

References

External links
  Futsal Thaileague co,ltd. (In Thai)

Futsal in Thailand
2018 in futsal